Game Plan (千方百计) is a Singaporean Chinese drama which debuted on 9 October 2012. This series was the second production by Wawa Pictures to be broadcast on MediaCorp Channel 8, the last series being "The Oath". It stars Christopher Lee , Jesseca Liu , Shaun Chen , Jacelyn Tay , Chen Shucheng , Lin Meijiao & Tong Bing Yu  as the casts of the series.

Synopsis
On her wedding day, Zhao Xintong (Jesseca Liu) learns that her fiance, Adam, is actually a scammer and has stolen a large sum of money. Desperate, she goes to Zhen Haoren (Christopher Lee), a scammer who just got out of jail, hoping to get her money back.

Little by little she falls in love with him, but things are more complicated than they seem.

Cast

Overseas broadcast
This drama is one of the first dramas to be broadcast exclusive in Malaysia after its first telecast of two weeks.

See also
List of Game Plan episodes
List of programmes broadcast by Mediacorp Channel 8

Awards & Nominations
Game Plan clinched 1 out of 4 nominations in the Star Awards. Lin Meijiao received the Best Supporting Actress award. The other dramas nominated for Best Drama Series are Don't Stop Believin' , Unriddle 2 , Pillow Talk & Poetic Justice

Star Awards 2013

References

External links
Game Plan on MediaCorp website
Game Plan (Chinese)
Official Website on xinmsn

Singapore Chinese dramas
2012 Singaporean television series debuts
Channel 8 (Singapore) original programming